Chilipi Krishnudu is a 1978 Telugu-language romantic drama film produced by D. Ramanaidu under the Suresh Productions banner and directed by Boina Subba Rao. It stars Akkineni Nageswara Rao and Vanisri, with music composed by K. V. Mahadevan. The film was remade in Hindi in 1980 as Bandish.

Plot 
Dr. Krishna (Akkineni Nageswara Rao) is a medic, the son of a rich businessman (Satyanarayana), for whom life is playing pranks and troubling people around. Sooner, he is taught a lesson in humility by a fellow student, Vani (Vanisri), and gets a dramatic change in his outlook. Here Krishna proposes to Vani then she explains her family responsibilities and life ambition of serving poor people in their remote village when Krishna promises to share her goals at every level. But their joy is short-lived as Raja (Prabhakar Reddy) a rogue who has an evil eye on Vani tries to molest Vani when she commits suicide. On her deathbed, Krishna gives a word to look after her family. After that, Krishna reaches the village where he is astounded to see Vani's twin sister Rani (again Vanisri) an illiterate village girl who lives with her mother Meenakshamma (Shanta Kumari). Soon Krishna establishes his hospital which irks local quack Nagalingam (Allu Ramalingaiah) who troubles Krishna in many ways. Meanwhile, absconding from police Raja reaches the same village and is seriously injured in the chase. Fortuitously his wife Lakshmi (Shubha) settles in that village and safeguards him. Nagalingam gives him a rude treatment by which his upper limp is completely poisonous. So, immediately Lakshmi rushes for Krishna when Raja encounters him but as a doctor performs his duty when he recognizes Raja as his elder brother who was separated in childhood. As there is no other alternative Krishna amputates his hand. After coming into consciousness, Raja learns the reality and pleads for a pardon from Krishna.

Meanwhile, Rani finds out the death secret of Vani, beyond, Meenakshamma is so anxious to see Vani. During the plight, Krishna plans by making villagers believe that Rani has fled away from the house, within no time transforms her into Vani and brings her back when she too loves Krishna. On the other side, Krishna hides Raja from Police and takes care of Lakshmi. Nagalingam exploits it, by attributing illicit relationships between them when Krishna remains silent to protect his brother. Now, Meenakshamma learns bereavement of Vani when everyone accuses Krishna except Rani who brings Raja into the light. At the same time, Krishna's father also arrives and makes the public understand his virtue of Krishna. At last, Raja surrenders to Police leaving Lakshmi's responsibility to his family. Finally, the movie ends on a happy note with the marriage of Krishna & Rani.

Cast 

Akkineni Nageswara Rao as Krishna
Vanisri as Vani / Rani (Dual role)
Satyanarayana as Krishna's father
Gummadi as Principal
Rao Gopal Rao as Narayana
Prabhakar Reddy as Raja
Raja Babu as Gopal
Allu Ramalingaiah as Nagalingam
K. V. Chalam as Vithal
K. K. Sarma as Sheshaiah
Ch. Krishna Murthy
Chitti Babu
Santha Kumari as Meenakshamma
Suryakantam as Mrs. James
Rama Prabha as Nagalingam 's daughter
Radha Kumari as a villager
Fatafat Jayalaxmi as Aasa
Shubha as Lakshmi

Soundtrack 
Music composed by K. V. Mahadevan.

References

External links 

1970s Telugu-language films
1978 romantic drama films
Films scored by K. V. Mahadevan
Indian romantic drama films
Suresh Productions films
Telugu films remade in other languages